Kim Dam-Min (Hangul: 김담민, Hanja: 金潭民) (born February 6, 1995) is a short track speed skater who competes for South Korea.

Career
In 2010, Kim was chosen by the South Korea national team at the age of 15. She won one gold, two silvers and four bronze medals at the World Cup. At the 2011 Asian Winter Games, she also won silver in 3000 m relay. She also won a gold medal at the 2011 World Team Championships in Warsaw.

External links

Profile from International Skating Union official website
Profile from Asian Winter Games official website

1995 births
Living people
South Korean female short track speed skaters
Asian Games medalists in short track speed skating
Short track speed skaters at the 2011 Asian Winter Games

Asian Games silver medalists for South Korea
Medalists at the 2011 Asian Winter Games
21st-century South Korean women